Maitrīpāda ( 1007–1085, also known as Maitreyanātha, Advayavajra, and, to Tibetans, Maitrīpa), was a prominent  Indian Buddhist Mahasiddha associated with the Mahāmudrā transmission of tantric Buddhism. His teachers were Shavaripa and Naropa. His students include Atisha, Marpa, Vajrapani, Karopa, Natekara (also known as Sahajavajra), Devākaracandra (also known as Śūnyatāsamādhi), and Rāmapāla. His hermitage was in the Mithila region (also known as Tirhut), somewhere in northern Bihar and neighboring parts of southern Nepal.

Early life
As per Tibetan and Nepalese sources, Maitripada was born into a Brahmin family in Magadha in a village near Kapilavastu during the rule of the Pala empire. His year of birth has been commonly placed 1007 C.E. as per the writings of Taranatha who places him around the rule of King Mahipala.
Prior to becoming a Buddhist, he was educated in Pāṇinian grammar and Hindu treatises for 7 years.

After his education, he encountered the Buddhist siddha Naropa who engaged him in a debate. Maitripada lost the debate and subsequently converted to Buddhism and was ordained as a monk at the monasteries of Nalanda and Vikramashila in modern-day Bihar.
During his stay at these monasteries he was taught by eminent masters such as Ratnākaraśānti.

Time at Nalanda and Vikramashila
Maitripada had his initial monastic ordination at Nalanda following which he dwelt in Vikramashila where he stayed for four years. While he was noted as an excellent monk, he was also said to be practicing tantra in secret. This was followed by a dispute with his guru, Ratnākaraśānti. Nepalese sources detail that following this dispute, the bodhisattva, Avalokiteśvara appeared in Maitripada's dreams and urged him to renounce the monastic life. Supposedly, he was expelled from the monastery after the abbot, Atiśa, discovered liquor in his dorms.

Travels in South India
Following this, he travelled for four months to South India via boat where he became a disciple of Shavaripa from who he received various tantric instructions. During the latter part of his life, he returned to North India where he composed numerous treaties which are now preserved in the Tibetan Buddhist canon.

Works
Maitrīpāda composed commentaries on the Buddhist dohas of Saraha. His most important works are a collection of 26 texts on "non-conceptual realization" (amanasikara), which are a key Indian source of mahāmudrā in the Tibetan tradition. These works teach a synthesis of Buddhist Mahayana teachings on emptiness and 'non-abiding' (apratisthana), and Buddhist tantric practices, and they also teach an "instantaneous" path to awakening.

Maitrīpāda's Amanasikara cycle of 26 texts is composed of the following:
 Kudrstinirghatana
Kudrstinirghatavakyatippinika
Mulapattayah
Sthulapattayah 
Tattvaratnavali
Pañcatathagatamudravivarana 
Sekanirdesa 
Caturmudranvaya 
Sekatatparyasamgraha
Vajrasattva-Pañcakara
Mayanirukti
Svapnanirukti 
Tattvaprakasa 
Apratisthanaprakasa 
Yuganaddhaprakasa 
Mahasukhaprakasa 
Tattvavimsika 
Mahayanavimsika 
NirvedhapañcakaMadhyamasatka PremapañcakaTattvadasakaAmanasikaradhara SahajasatkaDohanidhinamatattvopadesaShes pa spro bsdu med par 'jog pa 'i man ngag gsang ba dam paSee also
Marpa
Naropa

References

Notes

"The Life of the Siddha-Philosopher Maitrīgupta" by Mark Tatz Journal of the American Oriental Society''  Vol. 107, No. 4, 1987, Oct. - Dec. pgs 695-711

External links 

 Maitripa: India’s Yogi of Nondual Bliss by Klaus-Dieter Mathes

Mahasiddhas
Buddhist yogis
Indian Buddhists
Indian scholars of Buddhism
Monks of Nalanda
Monks of Vikramashila
1000s births
1085 deaths
11th-century Buddhist monks